Karel Anděl (28 December 1884 – 17 March 1947) was a Czechoslovak astronomer and selenographer. His Mappa Selenographica has been used in Norton's Star Atlas.

Bibliography
 Mappa Selenographica, 1926, Prague.

Awards and honors
The following astronomical features were named for him:
 Anděl (crater) on the Moon
 The asteroid "" was named 22465 Karelanděl

1884 births
1947 deaths
Czechoslovak astronomers